Jeremy Lemont Saunders (born June 11, 1983), better known by his stage name 2 Pistols (censored as 2P), is an American rapper from Tarpon Springs, Florida. After the local success of his independent single "Dirty Foot", he was offered a record deal with Universal Republic Records in 2007. His debut single, "She Got It" featuring T-Pain, was released in 2007 and peaked at number 7 on the Rhythmic Top 40 chart in 2008 and hit number 2 on the Billboard Hot Rap Tracks chart.

Biography 
From a broken home, Saunders grew up being looked after by his extended family. By his teens, he became involved in local crime and in 2005 was incarcerated for eight months. After this, he became involved in music promotion and formed a group called Blood Money Union, which consisted of other DJs, producers and rappers.

Saunders' first success in rapping came with a self-released record called "Dirty Foot", which he wrote while still in high school and distributed in the Tarpon Springs area at the urging of his cousin. After hearing it played in a local dance club and then witnessing another rapper's performance, 2 Pistols had his first chance to perform on-stage. After taking the stage and performing his own single ("Dirty Foot"), 2 Pistols' confidence in his abilities grew to a point that he began to take his chances at making a career of music seriously.

His debut album, Death Before Dishonor, was released on June 17, 2008 and featured production from the Grammy-winning J.U.S.T.I.C.E. League, Da Honorable C.N.O.T.E, Bolo Da Producer, and others. Tracks from the album included "You Know Me" featuring Ray J & "Thats My Word" featuring Trey Songz, in addition to "She Got It". The album peaked at number 32 on the Billboard 200 chart, and rose to number 10 on the Billboard Top R&B/Hip Hop album chart. 2 Pistols resides in Tampa, Florida and currently releases his music under his own label, Blood Money Union. In February 2014, the album Comin Back Hard appeared through Stage One Music.

Discography

Studio albums

Mixtapes 
 The Jimmy Jump Introduction (hosted by DJ Smallz) (2007)
 Live From the Kitchen (hosted by DJ Kid Hustle and DJ Hot Rod) (2009)
 10-20-Life (with Bigga Rankin) (2010)
 Hollow Tip Music (with DJ Dammit) (2010)
 Back 4 The 1st Time (hosted by DJ Hitz and DJ Woogie) (2010)
 The Rapture (hosted by DJ Spiniatik ) (2011)<ref>{{cite web |url= http://www.datpiff.com/2-Pistols-The-Rapture-mixtape.223751.html|title=2 Pistols A.K.A 2P – The Rapture Hosted by DJ Spiniatik </ // Free Mixtape @ DatPiff.com |work=datpiff.com |year=2011 |access-date=April 24, 2011}}</ref>
 Mr. P (hosted by DJ Dammit) (2011)
 Arrogant (Street Album)'' (hosted by DJ Scream ) (2012)

Singles

References

External links 

 

1983 births
Living people
African-American male rappers
American male rappers
American drug traffickers
Cash Money Records artists
People from Tarpon Springs, Florida
Rappers from Florida
Republic Records artists
Southern hip hop musicians
21st-century American rappers
21st-century American male musicians
21st-century African-American musicians
20th-century African-American people